Aristelliger praesignis, is a species of gecko, a lizard in the family Sphaerodactylidae. The species is endemic to Jamaica and the Cayman Islands.

Common names
Common names for Aristelliger praesignis include croaking lizard, Jamaican croaking gecko, Jamaican croaking lizard, and woodslave.

Taxonomy
Another species, Aristelliger nelsoni, is sometimes considered to be a subspecies of Aristelliger praesignis.

Geographic range
A. praesignis is found in Jamaica including the Bogue Islands, the Morant Cays, and the Pedro Cays. It is also found in the Cayman Islands.

Description
Dorsally, A. praesignis is brown with darker markings and white dots. Ventrally, it is whitish.

Reproduction
A. praesignis is oviparous.

References

Further reading
Boulenger GA (1885). Catalogue of the Lizards in the British Museum (Natural History). Second Edition. Volume I. Geckonidæ ... London: Trustees of the British Museum (Natural History). (Taylor and Francis, printers). xii + 436 pp. + Plates I-XXXII. (Aristelliger præsignis, pp. 146-147).
Hallowell E (1856). "Notes on the Reptiles in the collection of the Academy of Natural Sciences of Philad'a [sic]". Proceedings of the Academy of Natural Sciences of Philadelphia 8: 221-238. (Hemidactylus præsignis, new species, p. 222).
Schwartz A, Henderson RW (1991). Amphibians and Reptiles of the West Indies: Descriptions, Distributions, and Natural History. Gainesville, Florida: University of Florida Press. 720 pp. . (Aristelliger praesignis, p. 364). 
Schwartz A, Thomas R (1975). A Check-list of West Indian Amphibians and Reptiles. Carnegie Museum of Natural History Special Publication No. 1. Pittsburgh, Pennsylvania: Carnegie Museum of Natural History. 216 pp. (Aristelliger praesignis, p. 109).

Aristelliger
Reptiles described in 1856
Lizards of the Caribbean